Robert Muchmore is an Australian former professional rugby league footballer who played in the 1990s. He played his entire career for the Parramatta Eels. Muchmore made his debut for Parramatta in round 22 of the 1990 season against the Manly Warringah Sea Eagles. Muchmore's final game for Parramatta was in round 22 of the 1996 season against the Penrith Panthers.

References

Australian rugby league players
Parramatta Eels players
Rugby league wingers
Living people
Place of birth missing (living people)
1969 births